Jesper Petersen may refer to:
 Jesper Petersen (handballer)
 Jesper Petersen (politician)